Weedingia is a genus of chitons belonging to the family Hemiarthridae.

The species of this genus are found in Southern South Hemisphere.

Species:

Weedingia alborosea 
Weedingia exigua 
Weedingia mooreana 
Weedingia paulayi

References

Chitons
Chiton genera